Jonatan Ramón Maidana (born 29 July 1985) is an Argentine professional footballer who plays as a centre-back for River Plate.

Club career
After an initial period in Los Andes, Maidana transferred to Boca Juniors and made his debut with a 9-minute substitute appearance in a 2–2 draw with São Paulo F.C. in the 2006 Recopa Sudamericana. On 31 August 2008, Metalist Kharkiv secured Maidana's transfer. Two years later, in January 2010, he was loaned to reigning Argentine champions Banfield.

After six months in Banfield, Maidana joined River Plate, rivals of his former team Boca Juniors. The defender scored River's winning goal in the 1–0 victory over Boca for the 2010 Apertura's Superclásico.

In January 2019, Maidana was signed to Mexican side Toluca. On 18 December 2020, he left Toluca. 

On 13 February 2021, Maidana agreed his return to River Plate.

International career
Maidana represented the Argentina national under-20 football team. In 2008, he made his debut for the U-23 team in an unofficial friendly against Guatemala, scoring in the 5–0 victory.

Honours
Boca Juniors
 Copa Sudamericana (1): 2005
 Recopa Sudamericana (1): 2006
 Argentine Primera División (2): 2006 Clausura, 2008 Apertura
 Copa Libertadores (1): 2007

River Plate
 Primera B Nacional (1): 2011–12 Primera B Nacional
 Argentine Primera División (1): 2014 Final
 Copa Campeonato: 2013–14
 Copa Sudamericana (1): 2014
 Recopa Sudamericana (2): 2015 2016
 Copa Libertadores (2): 2015, 2018
 Suruga Bank Championship (1): 2015
 Copa Argentina (2): 2016, 2017
 Supercopa Argentina (2): 2017,  2019

Argentina
 Copa América: Runner-up 2016
 Superclásico de las Américas: 2017

References

External links
 
 Argentine Primera statistics at Fútbol XXI  
 

1985 births
Living people
People from Adrogué
Sportspeople from Buenos Aires Province
Association football defenders
Argentine footballers
Argentina international footballers
Argentine Primera División players
Primera Nacional players
Ukrainian Premier League players
Liga MX players
Club Atlético Los Andes footballers
Boca Juniors footballers
Club Atlético Banfield footballers
FC Metalist Kharkiv players
Club Atlético River Plate footballers
Deportivo Toluca F.C. players
Argentine expatriate footballers
Argentine expatriate sportspeople in Ukraine
Argentine expatriate sportspeople in Mexico
Expatriate footballers in Ukraine
Expatriate footballers in Mexico
Copa América Centenario players